Loquillo may refer to:

 Loquillo (singer), rock singer from Spain
 Loquillo (chief), Taino Cacique (Chief) of the area of Luquillo (named after him) located in the northeastern coast of Puerto Rico

Loquillo may also refer to the following place:
Loquillo National Forest, now El Yunque National Forest, Puerto Rico